Chervil (Anthriscus cerefolium), sometimes called French parsley or garden chervil (to distinguish it from similar plants also called chervil), is a delicate annual herb related to parsley. It was formerly called myrhis due to its volatile oil with an aroma similar to the resinous substance myrrh. It is commonly used to season mild-flavoured dishes and is a constituent of the French herb mixture .

Name

Biology

A member of the Apiaceae, chervil is native to the Caucasus but was spread by the Romans through most of Europe, where it is now naturalised. It is also grown frequently in the United States, where it sometimes escapes cultivation. Such escape can be recognized, however, as garden chervil is distinguished from all other Anthriscus species growing in North America (i.e., A. caucalis and A. sylvestris) by its having lanceolate-linear bracteoles and a fruit with a relatively long beak.

The fruit is about 1 cm long, oblong-ovoid with a slender, ridged beak.

Uses and impact

Culinary arts
Chervil is used, particularly in France, to season poultry, seafood, young spring vegetables (such as carrots), soups, and sauces. More delicate than parsley, it has a faint taste of liquorice or aniseed.

Chervil is one of the four traditional French , along with tarragon, chives, and parsley, which are essential to French cooking.

Chemistry
Essential oil obtained via water distillation of wild Turkish Anthriscus cerefolium was analyzed by gas chromatography - mass spectrometry identifying 4 compounds: methyl chavicol (83.10%), 1-allyl-2,4-dimethoxybenzene (15.15%), undecane (1.75%) and β-pinene (<0.01%).

Horticulture
According to some, slugs are attracted to chervil and the plant is sometimes used to bait them.

Health

Chervil has had various uses in folk medicine. It was claimed to be useful as a digestive aid, for lowering high blood pressure, and, infused with vinegar, for curing hiccups. Besides its digestive properties, it is used as a mild stimulant.

Chervil has also been implicated in "strimmer dermatitis", another name for phytophotodermatitis, due to spray from weed trimmers and similar forms of contact. Other plants in the family Apiaceae can have similar effects.

Cultivation
Transplanting chervil can be difficult, due to the long taproot. It prefers a cool and moist location; otherwise, it rapidly goes to seed (also known as bolting). It is usually grown as a cool-season crop, like lettuce, and should be planted in early spring and late fall or in a winter greenhouse. Regular harvesting of leaves also helps to prevent bolting. If plants bolt despite precautions, the plant can be periodically re-sown throughout the growing season, thus producing fresh plants as older plants bolt and go out of production.

References

Further reading
 

Apioideae
Edible Apiaceae
Herbs
Medicinal plants of Asia
Medicinal plants of Europe
Root vegetables